Richmond-Queensborough is a provincial electoral district for the Legislative Assembly of British Columbia, Canada that was created in the 2015 redistribution from parts of Richmond East and New Westminster. It was first contested in the 2017 election.

Demographics

History
This riding has elected the following Members of Legislative Assembly:

Election results

Student vote results 
Student Vote Canada is a non-partisan program in Canada that holds mock elections in elementary and high schools alongside general elections (with the same candidates and same electoral system).

External links 
Hi-res map (pdf)

References

British Columbia provincial electoral districts
Politics of Richmond, British Columbia
New Westminster
Provincial electoral districts in Greater Vancouver and the Fraser Valley